Ceuașu de Câmpie is a commune in Mureș County, Transylvania, Romania composed of eight villages:

Bozed / Bazéd
Câmpenița / Mezőfele
Ceuașu de Câmpie / Mezőcsávás (namesake of the commune)
Culpiu / Mezőkölpény
Herghelia / Mezőménes
Porumbeni / Galambod
Săbed / Szabéd
Voiniceni / Mezőszabad

Demographics
The commune has a relative Székely Hungarian majority. According to the 2002 census, it has a population of 5,419 of which 49.36% or 2,675 are Hungarian. 2,222 or 41% are Romanians.

See also 
 List of Hungarian exonyms (Mureș County)

References

Communes in Mureș County
Localities in Transylvania
Székely communities